A bushel (abbreviation: bsh. or bu.) is an imperial and US customary unit of volume based upon an earlier measure of dry capacity. The old bushel is equal to 2 kennings (obsolete), 4 pecks, or 8 dry gallons, and was used mostly for agricultural products, such as wheat. In modern usage, the volume is nominal, with bushels denoting a mass defined differently for each commodity.

The name "bushel" is also used to translate similar units in other measurement systems.

Name
The word "bushel" as originally used for a container itself, and later a unite of measurement. It may further derive from Old French , thus meaning "little butt".

History 

The bushel is an intermediate value between the pound and ton or tun that was introduced to England following the Norman Conquest. Norman statutes made the London bushel part of the legal measure of English wine, ale, and grains. The Assize of Bread and Ale credited to Henry III, defined this bushel in terms of the wine gallon, while the  Assize of Weights and Measures usually credited to Edward I or II defined the London bushel in terms of the larger corn gallon. In either case, the bushel was reckoned to contain 64 pounds of 12 ounces of 20 pennyweight of 32 grains.

These measures were based on the relatively light tower pound and were rarely used in Scotland, Ireland, or Wales during the Middle Ages. When the Tower system was abolished in the 16th century, the bushel was redefined as 56 avoirdupois pounds.

This is the bushel in some use in the United Kingdom. Thus, there is no distinction between liquid and dry measure in the imperial system. 

The modern American or US bushel is a variant of this, rounded to exactly 2150.42 cubic inches, less than one part per ten million less. It is also somewhat in use in Canada.

Volume

Weight

Bushels are now most often used as units of mass or weight rather than of volume. The bushels in which grains are bought and sold on commodity markets or at local grain elevators, and for reports of grain production, are all units of weight. This is done by assigning a standard weight to each commodity that is to be measured in bushels. These bushels depend on the commodities being measured, and on the moisture content of the commodity. Some of the more common ones are:

 Oats:
 US: 32 lb (14.5150 kg)
 Canada: 34 lb (15.4221 kg)
 Barley: 48 lb (21.7724 kg)
 Malted barley: 34 lb (15.4221 kg)
 Shelled maize (corn) at 15.5% moisture by weight: 56 lb (25.4012 kg)
 Wheat at 13.5% moisture by weight: 60 lb (27.2155 kg)
 Soybeans at 13% moisture by weight: 60 lb (27.2 kg)
Other specific values are defined (and those definitions may vary within different jurisdictions, including from state to state in the United States) for other grains, oilseeds, fruits, vegetables, coal, hair and many other commodities.

Government policy in the United States is to phase out units such as the bushel and replace them with metric mass equivalents.

Other units

A Prussian scheffel was equal to 54.96 litres.

The Polish bushel was used as measure of dry capacity. It is divided into 4 quarters and in the early 19th century had a value of 128 litres in Warsaw and 501.116 litres in Kraków.

The Spanish bushel was used as a measure of dry capacity. It is roughly equal to 55.5 litres in Castille.

See also
 Coomb (unit)
 Lamp under a bushel
 Winchester measure

References

External links
 

Units of volume
Imperial units
Customary units of measurement in the United States
Grain production